Financial History Review is a peer-reviewed academic journal published three times a year by Cambridge University Press on behalf of The European Association for Banking and Financial History (eabh). Established in 1994, the journal covers the historical development of banking, finance, and monetary matters. Articles address a broad range of issues of financial and monetary history, including technical and theoretical approaches, those derived from cultural and social perspectives and the interrelations between politics and finance. It is the only authoritative academic journal dedicated solely to financial history.

History
The field of financial and banking history began in the 1930s with early research on British institutions, such as the Sir John Clapham's study on the Bank of England and W. F. Crick and J. E. Wadsworth's research on joint-stock banking. Subsequent on the early-modern period began in the 1950s/1960s, covering topics such as bills of exchange, the English financial revolution, and Italian merchant bankers. One challenge to its growth was the growing split between academics in history and in economic history. From the late 1950s, economic history increasingly became a sub-field of economics, rather than of history. This change also coincided with the growing use of quantitative models and cliometric analysis. Meanwhile, historians began to combine the study of economic and social phenomena through the methodologies founded by the Annales School in France. This new discipline paved the way for Economic and Social History programmes, common at universities in the United Kingdom and Europe. As such, financial history, since the 1980s, remained a comparatively small sub-field compared to other sub-disciplines, like economic history and business history.

The first international academic organisation dedicated to financial history was the European Association for Banking and Financial History (eabh), founded in 1990. The eabh subsequently created the Financial History Review in 1994. The journal was co-founded by Youssef Cassis (Professor of Economic History, European University Institute) and Philip Cottrell (Emeritus Professor of Financial History, University of Leicester). According to Cassis, financial history has seen rapid growth in the past two decades: "Financial history has managed to remain a fairly homogenous discipline."

In recent issues, the FHR has also strived to be international in scope. Financial institutions and multinational banking requires delving into the role of cross-border or transnational histories. Cassis and Cottrell strived to define financial history as broadly as possible, understanding that there are common overlapping themes with social history, cultural history, and area studies: "The present purpose has not been to give voice to some particular sectarian view, but to try and indicate that this journal represents a broad church, within both financial history and history".

Today, the journal remains the main academic journal dedicated solely to the field of financial history. The journal publishes articles on the interrelations of finance, history, public policy, culture, and society. Book reviews are published in "The Past Mirror" section of the journal. Each volume contains research articles, a reviews section, and an annual bibliography. According to its inaugural publication, the journal aims to promote closer collaboration between "academic practitioners and the practical world of banking and finance". The articles rely predominantly on descriptive, analytical, and a mix of qualitative and quantitative evidence. Its findings have been featured in media news outlets, such as Forbes.

Abstracting and indexing 
The journal is indexed by EBSCO, Scopus, International Bibliography of the Social Sciences, and RePEc.

See also
The Journal of Economic History
Economic History Review
Business History Review

References

External links 
 

Publications established in 1994
Economic history journals
Cambridge University Press academic journals
Triannual journals
English-language journals
Academic journals associated with learned and professional societies